Rodington  is a civil parish in the district of Telford and Wrekin, Shropshire, England.  It contains 20 listed buildings that are recorded in the National Heritage List for England.  Of these, one is listed at Grade I, the highest of the three grades, two are at Grade II*, the middle grade, and the others are at Grade II, the lowest grade.  The parish contains the villages of Rodington and Longdon-on-Tern, and is otherwise rural.  The Shrewsbury Canal, now disused, passed through the parish, and a surviving cast iron aqueduct is listed.  Most of the other listed buildings are houses and associated structures, cottages, farmhouses and farm buildings, the earliest of which are timber framed.  The other listed buildings include a public house, two churches, and two bridges.


Key

Buildings

References

Citations

Sources

Lists of buildings and structures in Shropshire